Theodorescu is a Romanian surname. Notable people with the surname include:

Cicerone Theodorescu (1908-1974), poet
Dem. Theodorescu (1888-1946), journalist and critic
George Theodorescu, dressage trainer
Ion Theodorescu-Sion (1882-1939), painter
Monica Theodorescu (1963-), German equestrian and dressage rider
Răzvan Theodorescu (1939-), historian and politician
Tudor Arghezi (1880-1967), born Ion N. Theodorescu, writer

See also
Teodorescu

Romanian-language surnames
Patronymic surnames
Surnames from given names